Lullaby is a 2022 Spanish drama film directed and written by Alauda Ruiz de Azúa. It stars Laia Costa and Susi Sánchez alongside Ramón Barea and Mikel Bustamante.

Plot 
After giving birth Amaia returns to her parents' home as her partner is away for some time.

Cast

Production 
The project underwent development at the ECAM's incubator program. The film was produced by Encanta Films, Sayaka Producciones and BuenaPinta Media, and it had the participation of RTVE, EiTB and Orange and funding from ICAA, the Basque Government, the Madrid regional administration and Crea SGR. Shooting lasted for 5 weeks and it took place in between Madrid and Biscay (Mundaka and Bakio). In addition to Spanish, it also features Basque- and English-language dialogue.

Release 
The film had its world premiere in February 2022, screened as part of the 72nd Berlin International Film Festival's Panorama section. It also screened at the 25th Málaga Film Festival on 20 March 2022 as part of the festival's main competition. Distributed by BTeam Pictures, it was theatrically released in Spain on 20 May 2022.

Reception

Critical reception
According to the review aggregation website Rotten Tomatoes, Lullaby has a 100% approval rating based on 10 reviews from critics, with an average rating of 8.3/10.

Jonathan Holland of ScreenDaily presented the film as an "absorbing mother-daughter drama set on the Basque coast", deeming it to be strongest "in the subtle and compassionate characterisation of its women".

Pere Vall of Fotogramas rated the film 4 out of 5 stars, highlighting the "absence of broad-brush" and the "duel/deal" between the "grandiose" Laia Costa and Susi Sánchez.

Irene Crespo of Cinemanía also gave it 4 out of 5 stars, summarizing the film as "a brilliant and emotional debut beyond motherhood" in her veredict.

Spanish film director Pedro Almodóvar called the film "undoubtedly the best debut in Spanish cinema for years", expressing the mother-daughter relationship as "a portrait of the role of women within the family, which is truthful, devoid of sentimentality and that does not exclude humor" and highlighting the performance of Laia Costa.

In August 2022, the members of the Academy of Cinematographic Arts and Sciences of Spain selected Lullaby in their shortlist of three pre-selections for their submission to the 95th Academy Awards for Best International Feature Film alongside Alcarràs and The Beasts.

Top ten lists 
The film appeared on a number of critics' top ten lists of the best Spanish films of 2022:

Accolades 

|-
| align = "center" rowspan = "8" | 2022 || rowspan = "4" | 25th Málaga Film Festival || colspan = "2" | Golden Biznaga for Best Spanish Film ||  || rowspan = "3" | 
|-
| Best Actress || Laia Costa & Susi Sánchez || 
|-
| Best Screenplay || Alauda Ruiz de Azúa || 
|-
| colspan = "2" | Audience Choice Award ||  || 
|-
| rowspan = "4" | 28th Forqué Awards || colspan = "2" | Best Film ||  || rowspan = "4" | 
|-
| rowspan = "2" | Best Film Actress || Laia Costa || 
|-
| Susi Sánchez || 
|-
| colspan = "2" | Cinema and Education in Values || 
|-
| rowspan = "40" align = "center" | 2023 || 15th Gaudí Awards || colspan = "2" | Best European Film ||  || 
|-
| rowspan = "7" | 10th Feroz Awards || colspan = "2" | Best Drama Film ||  || rowspan = "7" | 
|-
| Best Director || Alauda Ruiz de Azúa || 
|-
| Best Screenplay || Alauda Ruiz de Azúa || 
|-
| Best Actress in a Film || Laia Costa || 
|-
| Best Supporting Actress in a Film || Susi Sánchez || 
|-
| Best Supporting Actor in a Film || Ramón Barea || 
|-
| Best Soundtrack || Aránzazu Calleja || 
|-
|-
| 2nd Carmen Awards || colspan = "2" | Best Non-Andalusian Film ||  || 
|-
| rowspan = "9" | 78th CEC Medals || colspan = "2" | Best Film ||  || rowspan = "9" align = "center" | 
|-
| Best New Director || Alauda Ruiz de Azúa || 
|-
| Best Actress || Laia Costa ||  
|-
| Best Supporting Actress || Susi Sánchez || 
|-
| Best Supporting Actor || Ramón Barea || 
|-
| Best New Actor || Mikel Bustamante || 
|-
| Best Original Screenplay || Alauda Ruiz de Azúa || 
|-
| Best Cinematography || Jon D. Domínguez || 
|-
| Best Editing || Andrés Gil || 
|-
| rowspan = "11" | 37th Goya Awards || colspan = "2" | Best Film ||  || rowspan = "11" | 
|-
| Best New Director || Alauda Ruiz de Azúa ||  
|-
| Best Original Screenplay || Alauda Ruiz de Azúa || 
|-
| Best Actress || Laia Costa || 
|-
| Best Supporting Actress || Susi Sánchez ||  
|-
| Best Supporting Actor || Ramón Barea || 
|-
| Best New Actor || Mikel Bustamante || 
|-
| Best Cinematography || Jon D. Domínguez || 
|-
| Best Editing || Andrés Gil || 
|-
| Best Sound || Asier González, Eva de la Fuente López, Roberto Fernández || 
|-
| Best Production Supervision || María José Díez || 
|-
| rowspan = "4" | 31st Actors and Actresses Union Awards || Best Film Actress in a Leading Role || Laia Costa ||  || rowspan = "4" | 
|-
| Best Film Actress in a Secondary Role || Susi Sánchez || 
|-
| Best Film Actor in a Minor Role || Ramón Barea || 
|-
| Best New Actor || Mikel Bustamante || 
|-
| rowspan = "6" | 10th Platino Awards || Best Actress || Laia Costa ||  || rowspan = "6" | 
|-
| Best Supporting Actress || Susi Sánchez || 
|-
| Best Supporting Actor || Ramón Barea || 
|-
| Best Original Score || Aránzazu Calleja || 
|-
| colspan = "2" | Best Ibero-American Debut Film || 
|-
| colspan = "2" | Cinema and Values Education || 
|-
|}

See also 
 List of Spanish films of 2022

References

External links
 

2022 drama films
2022 films
Films featuring a Best Actress Goya Award-winning performance
Films shot in Madrid
Films shot in the Basque Country (autonomous community)
2020s Spanish-language films
Films about mother–daughter relationships
2020s Spanish films
Spanish drama films